Chandni Raatein (also spelled Chaandni Raatain) is a Pakistani drama centered on certain South Asian cultural backgrounds, and issues such as polygamy, motherhood and the distanced mother and daughter-in-law bond. The show aired on Pakistan Television in 2002, and repeat-telecasted from the same channel in 2008.

Plot
Head of her family, Bee Jan (Safia Khairi) has her own strict set of rules and cultural values, which she enforces in her home with zeal and zest. The all-mighty but too traditional mother has two sons, Aamir (Javed Sheikh), who is married to Abginey (Faryal Gohar); and Aasim (Humayun Saeed), who is unmarried.

Aamir and Abginey are childless, despite eight years of happy marriage. Seeing how Abginey can not bear a child, Bee Jan decides to marry her elder son off to a younger, prettier girl. A submissive son with an almost scary mother, Aamir can not stand up and fight for Abginey. The result is his marriage to Maha (Mahnoor Baloch).

Maha is a rude, unorthodox girl, who lives life the way she wants, and clearly refuses to follow Bee Jan's rules. Bee Jan is angry but, when Maha becomes pregnant, all of her fury vanishes. Abginey is still childless, and her position in the house continues to deteriorate as Maha treats her like filth.

It is during these circumstances that Abginey's London-residing family - her parents (Badar Khalil and Shehryar Zaidi) and her younger sister, Zarmeeney (Aaminah Haq) - pay a surprise visit to Abginey. They are shocked to learn of Aamir's second marriage, which Abginey had not told them of. They try hard to take Abginey back to London with them, but she refuses outright.

Maha, meanwhile, wants Aamir's younger brother, Asim, to marry her cousin, Iraj. Defying Bee Jan and Aamir, Asim declares his love for Zarmeeney. Bee Jan is afraid that Zarmeeney might, like sister Abginey, be infertile, but Asim refuses to listen. They marry and, despite a lot of problems, come together as a happy couple in the end.

A subplot also reveals how Maha had been married previously, and has a son from that marriage.

Reception
"The role of a woman towards/against/supporting [another woman]' has been called the 'essence of the drama."

In 2008, Chandni Ratein was repeatedly telecast on PTV Home. The drama was aired from Monday to Friday for thirty minutes each day during the Matinee Time show, which re-telecasts quality television serials to provide home, family entertainment.

Cast
Faryal Gohar as Abginey Aamir (Abi) - Aamir's first wife (Badi Dulhan)
Mahnoor Baloch as Maha Aamir - Aamir's second wife (Choti Dulhan)
Humayun Saeed as Asim 
Javed Sheikh as Aamir
Aminah Haq as Zarminay - Abginey younger sister married to Asim 
Safia Khairi
Zaheen Tahira as Bee Jee
Badar Khalil as Abiney's mother
Latif Kapadia
Kulsoon Sultan
Tamanna
Jahanzeb Khan

Lux Style Awards
 Best TV Play-Won
 Best TV Actor-Humayun Saeed-Won
 Best TV Actress-Faryal Gohar-Nominated

References

Pakistani drama television series
Urdu-language television shows
Pakistan Television Corporation original programming
2002 Pakistani television series debuts